Titulcia is a genus of moths of the family Nolidae. The genus was erected by Francis Walker in 1864.

Species
Titulcia argyroplaga Hampson, 1912 Myanmar
Titulcia confictella Walker, 1864 Borneo, north-eastern Hiamalayas, Taiwan, Myanmar, Thailand, Peninsular Malaysia, Sumatra, Palawan
Titulcia eximia Walker, 1864 Borneo, Myanmar (Mergui Archipelago), Peninsular Malaysia, Sumatra
Titulcia javensis Warren, 1916 Java, Sumatra
Titulcia meterythra Hampson, 1905 Borneo, Peninsular Malaysia, Sumatra
Titulcia rufimargo Hampson, 1912 Borneo, Sumatra, Java

References

Chloephorinae